Job, czyli ostatnia szara komórka (Yob, or The Last Brain Cell) is a 2006 Polish comedy film directed by Konrad Niewolski.

The film is a set of many popular jokes, and also a story of three friends – Adi, Pele and Chemik, who experience many adventures.

Cast 
 Tomasz Borkowski – Adi
 Andrzej Andrzejewski – Pele
 Borys Szyc – Chemik
 Agnieszka Włodarczyk – Karolina
 Elżbieta Jarosik – Gorzyńska
 Aleksander Mikołajczak – Film critic
 Maria Klejdysz – Grandmother of Pele
 Henryk Gołębiewski – Uncle Edi
 Arkadiusz Detmer – Łukasz from "Symetria"
 Jerzy Schejbal – Ambassador of Hungary
 Piotr Zelt – Football fan at the doctor's
 Krzysztof Ibisz – Host of the game show
 Janusz Onufrowicz – Rastafari man
 Sławomir Sulej – Man from ORMO
 Rafał Cieszyński – Fitness instructor
 Paweł Nowisz – Driving instructor

External links 

2006 films
2006 comedy films
2000s Polish-language films
Polish black comedy films